Uluilakeba  was the eldest son of Niumataiwalu. He did not succeed to his fathers title, first since his father was not known to have been installed to the title of either Tui Nayau or Sau ni Vanua ko Lau, second in the test of feat that had ensued to select the candidate for the title of Tui Nayau he was known to have been one of the two sons of Niumataiwalu who had backed down from the unnerving jump that was  put to them by the Bete. In that test of feat it was said as related orally that he as an excuse to allay any possible accusation of cowardice on his part said that since he was the eldest his claim to the title was already established by birthright and thence there was no need for him to prove himself. Rasolo then on the account of his elder brothers excuse, the second eldest of the three then took up the challenge, after Matawalu the youngest had also surrendered up any idea of contesting.

After his unsuccessful bid to the title it was later said that he had made a second attempt after Rasolo had established himself as not only the Tui Nayau but also Sau ni Vanua ko Lau in Lakeba . The account as orally related, it was said that he had remained at Nayau whilst frequenting Lakeba on occasions and on one of those occasions he with a band of followers conspired against Rasolo. This was known by the Vakavanua of Nayau, the Tui Nayau's representative on Nayau on hearing of the plot told his son who was a young fellow to go and hide himself at the bow of the Drua and on arrival on Lakeba to immediately sneak and find his way to what is now Nakorovusa the old village site and relate the account of an assassination plot to the Sau on the guise of a friendly visit by his elder brother. The Sau on hearing of the imminent attempt on his life summoned the Tongans who were at the present village site of Tubou to stage a mock ceremonial reception to the visiting party while a dispatched war party lay ambush within the vicinity of a conversation hearing distance from where the formal reception was taking place . This went on until it was ascertained that the visiting party had no doubt fallen for the trap when the war party fell on the unsuspecting assailants and thence Uluilakeba and his followers were clubbed at a site known to the present day where an Ivi (chestnut) tree  stands. However, for Uluilakeba himself an account also says that he retreated from the village site and onto the beach and made an attempt to swim for his life and on knowing that it would be futile, made a stand and hence clubbed. He came to his end and when they had apportioned him to the ovens his younger brother the Sau, Rasolo stopped what was to be a complete humiliation of the person of Uluilakeba and instead was to be left at where he had fallen.

The account of this unsuccessful aspirant's attempt went on to say that on the next day when the villagers went down to the beach his body had washed up on the beach eaten by sharks and a certain kind of white sea crab had gathered on what was left of his carcase. And that is why the custom with the Vuanirewa clan to this day are forbidden from the meat of the white tipped coral reef sharks and the Lairo vula (white sea crab) because of Uluilakeba's birthright entitlement.

Fijian chiefs
People from Lakeba
Vuanirewa
People from Nayau